Wilitty Younoussa (born 9 September 2001) is a Cameroonian professional footballer who plays as a midfielder for French  club Rodez.

Career
On 13 March 2020, Younoussa signed his first professional contract with Dijon FCO. Younoussa made his professional debut with Dijon in a 2-0 Ligue 1 loss to Brest on 13 September 2020.

On 23 August 2022, Younoussa signed a two-year contract with Rodez.

International career
Younoussa represented the Cameroon U17s at the 2017 Africa U-17 Cup of Nations.

References

External links

DFCO Profile
BDFutbol Profile

2001 births
Living people
People from North Region (Cameroon)
Cameroonian footballers
Cameroon youth international footballers
Association football midfielders
Dijon FCO players
Rodez AF players
Ligue 1 players
Ligue 2 players
Cameroonian expatriate footballers
Cameroonian expatriate sportspeople in France
Expatriate footballers in France